Louis Alonzo Young (February 19, 1893 – July 19, 1948) was an American college football player and coach. He served as the head football coach at the University of Pennsylvania from 1923 to 1929, compiling a record of 49–15–2. Young played football at Penn from 1912 to 1914, captaining the team in 1913. He died at the age of 56 on July 19, 1948 in Philadelphia.

Head coaching record

References

External links
 

1893 births
1948 deaths
American football ends
American football halfbacks
Penn Quakers football coaches
Penn Quakers football players
Players of American football from Philadelphia